Pedro Thomas Ruiz de Velasco de la Madrid (April 1, 1915 – August 18, 1996) was a Mexican businessman and the family holder of several historical documents from Mexico including the original Acta de Independencia del Imperio Mexicano de 1821.

Biography 

Pedro Ruiz de Velasco was born in the Mexican Federal District and married Susana Esperanza Zenteno August 2, 1945.  His children included Veronica Ruiz de Velasco, an important Mexican neo-figurative artist. His sisters were Teófila Ruiz de Velasco de la Madrid, María de Lourdes Ruiz de Velasco de la Madrid, Caridad Ruiz de Velasco de la Madrid, Beatriz Ruiz de Velasco de la Madrid, & Guadalupe Lucía Beatriz Ruiz de Velasco y la Madrid.  His brothers were Felipe Salvador Ruiz de Velasco de la Madrid and Pedro Tomás Ruiz de Velasco de la Madrid. 

The Ruiz de Velasco family were the original owners for 128 years of the Acta de Independencia del Imperio Mexicano de 1821. This document was passed down through generations from Nicolás Bravo.  On August 22, 1987, Pedro Ruiz de Velasco gave the document as a gift to Mexico.

Jose Francisco Ruiz Massieu accepted this gift and secured this historical document in the Museo Historico de Acapulco Fuerte de San Diego in Acapulco in the State of Guerrero.

Pedro Ruiz de Velasco died in México D.F. at the age of 81.

References

Diaz Clavel, Enrique, "Donan al Gobierno de Guerrero el Acta de la Independencia", Excelsior - El Periodico de la Vida Nacional, August 23, 1987.  
Robles Benitez, Armando; "Historicos Documentos se Deterioran", Acapulco Novedades, June 5, 1988.  
Estrada, Jaime, "La Independencia llega a Nuestra Ciudad!!!", El Centro, March 5, 1992. 
 Trejo, Guillermina, "Resguardó descendiente de Nicolás Bravo una de tres copias del Acta de Independencia", January 29, 2013 

1915 births
1996 deaths
20th-century Mexican businesspeople
Businesspeople from Mexico City